The Kleine Röder, also called the Schwarzgraben, is a river in Saxony and Brandenburg, Germany.

It branches off the Große Röder near Zabeltitz. It flows into the Black Elster near  (a district of Bad Liebenwerda).

See also
List of rivers of Saxony
List of rivers of Brandenburg

References

Rivers of Saxony
Rivers of Brandenburg
Elbe-Elster Land
Rivers of Germany